The State budget of Norway is a government budget passed by the Norwegian legislature, Stortinget, each year. It accumulates all income and expenses for the Government of Norway. The document defines the taxes to be collected, and what expenses will be accomplished.

The budget follows a fiscal year of January 1 to December 31. The proposition for the budget is made by the Ministry of Finance in the first week of October. This proposition is named Storting Proposition no. 1 or Yellow Book and is the governments suggestion for a budget. It is then considered by the Standing Committee of Finance.

If there is a majority government, the budget is normally passed without much change. In case of a minority government, which have been more the rule than the exception since the 1970s, the government party(s) must negotiate with enough opposition parties to pass it in the legislature. The responsibility to audit the accounts is at the Office of the Auditor General of Norway.

State budget 2007
All sums in NOK million

Main figures
Expenses
Operating costs: 109,355
Investments: 40,334
Transfers: 927,708
Lending and instalment: 2
Total costs: 1,202,683
Income
Operating income: 132,970
from investments: 16,179
Taxes and transfers: 928,248
Paybacks: 59,682
Total income:1,137,079

Specifications
Operating costs
Military: 20,754
State roads: 7,110
Railway: 3,282
Police and prosecution: 9,017
Courts: 1,889
Prisons: 2,291
Labour and welfare management: 7,616
Tax administration: 4,833
Pensions to state employees: 8,499
Ministries: 5,520
State wage negotiations: 9,720
Commercial activity: -371
Other costs: 29,194
Subtotal: 109,355
Investment costs
State petroleum activity: 18,300
Defence: 9,257
State roads: 5,408
Buildings: 1,595
Other buildings: 1,500
Railway: 2,220
Other investments: 2 055
Subtotal: 40,334
Transfers
Pension Fund: 364,893
Other state budgets: 33,611
Municipalities: 101,127
Pensions: 245,239
Other transfers: 182,838
Subtotal: 927,708
Operating income
From SDFI: 122,300
Other: 10,670
Subtotal: 132,970
Transfer 
Dividend: 57,042

References 

Government of Norway
Public finance of Norway